The discography of Ash, a Northern Irish alternative rock band, consists of seven studio albums, three live album, five compilation albums, one EP and sixty singles.

Albums

Studio albums

Mini-albums

Live albums

Compilation albums

EPs

Singles

 A ^ Australia-only release.

a Ineligible for singles chart due to number of tracks
b Downloads chart exclusive. Reached number 1.
c Free download from ashofficial.com

Music videos

References

Discographies of Irish artists
Ash
Discography